Mamar may refer to:
Məmər, Azerbaijan
Mario role-playing games
Mamar Yek, Iran
Mamar Seh, Iran

See also
Mamar Kassey, jazz-pop-ethnic musical formation from Niger